Phillip Coleman (born 8 September 1960) is an English footballer who played as a defender in the Football League.

He began his career in the youth ranks of Millwall, where he played as a defender and midfielder, notably scoring one of two Millwall goals in the 1979 FA Youth Cup Final win against Manchester City.

He made his first senior appearance for Millwall in a 2-1 win v West Ham , turning professional in August 1978. In 1981 Colchester United manager Bobby Roberts signed Coleman from Millwall for a fee of £15,000.

After retiring from playing Coleman trained to be a PE teacher, receiving a BA Honours degree in Sport and Education from Middlesex University. He also served as manager of Wivenhoe and coach at Clacton, Heybridge and Braintree. 

Coleman is currently a PE teacher at the Sigma Sports academy at Philip Morant School and College in Colchester, previously having taught at The Gilberd School and The Colne Community School and College. He is also a Liberal Democrat councillor for Mile End on Colchester Borough Council. 

His son, Liam Coleman, also played football professionally.

Coleman caught COVID-19 during the COVID-19 pandemic, being informed of a positive test result on Christmas Day 2020.

References

1960 births
Living people
Footballers from Woolwich
English footballers
Association football defenders
Millwall F.C. players
Colchester United F.C. players
Wrexham A.F.C. players
Chelmsford City F.C. players
Exeter City F.C. players
Aldershot F.C. players
Dulwich Hamlet F.C. players
Myllykosken Pallo −47 players
Wivenhoe Town F.C. players
English Football League players